xkcd, sometimes styled XKCD, is a webcomic created in 2005 by American author Randall Munroe. The comic's tagline describes it as "a webcomic of romance, sarcasm, math, and language". Munroe states on the comic's website that the name of the comic is not an initialism but "just a word with no phonetic pronunciation".

The subject matter of the comic varies from statements on life and love to mathematical, programming, and scientific in-jokes. Some strips feature simple humor or pop-culture references. It has a cast of stick figures, and the comic occasionally features landscapes, graphs, charts, and intricate mathematical patterns such as fractals. New cartoons are added three times a week, on Mondays, Wednesdays, and Fridays.

Munroe has released five spinoff books from the comic. The first book, published in 2010 and entitled xkcd: volume 0, was a series of select comics from his website. His 2014 book What If? is based on his blog of the same name that answers unusual science questions from readers in a light-hearted way that is scientifically grounded. The What If column on the site is updated with new articles from time to time. His 2015 book Thing Explainer explains scientific concepts using only the one thousand most commonly used words in English. A fourth book, How To, which is described as "a profoundly unhelpful self-help book", was released on September 3, 2019. A fifth book, What If? 2, was released on September 13, 2022.

History 

As a student, Munroe often drew charts, maps, and "stick figure battles" in the margins of his school notebooks, besides solving mathematical problems unrelated to his classes. By the time he graduated from college, Munroe's "piles of notebooks" became too large and he started scanning the images.

xkcd began in September 2005, when Munroe decided to scan his doodles and put them on his personal website. According to Munroe, the comic's name has no particular significance and is simply a four-letter word without a phonetic pronunciation, something he describes as "a treasured and carefully guarded point in the space of four-character strings." In January 2006, the comic was split off into its own website, created in collaboration with Derek Radtke.

In May 2007, the comic garnered widespread attention by depicting online communities in geographic form. Various websites were drawn as continents, each sized according to their relative popularity and located according to their general subject matter. This put xkcd at number two on the Syracuse Post-Standard's "The new hotness" list. By 2008, xkcd was able to financially support Munroe and Radtke "reasonably well" through the sale of thousands of T-shirts per month.

On September 19, 2012, "Click and Drag" was published, which featured a panel which can be explored via clicking and dragging its insides. It immediately triggered positive response on social websites and forums. The large image nested in the panel measures 165,888 pixels wide by 79,822 pixels high. Munroe later described it as "probably the most popular one I ever put on the Internet", as well as placing it among his own favorites.

"Time" began publication at midnight EDT on March 25, 2013, with the comic's image updating every 30 minutes until March 30, when they began to change every hour, lasting for over four months. The images constitute time lapse frames of a story, with the tooltip originally reading "Wait for it.", later changed to "RUN." and changed again to "The end." on July 26. The story began with a male and female character building a sandcastle complex on a beach who then embark on an adventure to learn the secrets of the sea. On July 26, the comic superimposed a frame (3094) with the phrase "The End". Tasha Robinson of The A.V. Club wrote of the comic: "[...] the kind of nifty experiment that keeps people coming back to XKCD, which at its best isn't a strip comic so much as an idea factory and a shared experience". Cory Doctorow mentioned "Time" in a brief article on Boing Boing on April 7, saying the comic was "coming along nicely". The 3,099-panel "Time" comic ended on July 26, 2013, and was followed by a blog post summarizing the journey. In 2014, it won the Hugo Award for Best Graphic Story.

Around 2007, Munroe drew all the comics on paper, then scanned and processed them on a tablet computer (a Fujitsu Lifebook). , he was using a Cintiq graphics tablet for drawing (like many other cartoonists), alongside a laptop for coding tasks.

Influences
 

Munroe has been a fan of newspaper comic strips since childhood, describing xkcd as an "heir" to Charles M. Schulz's Peanuts. Despite this influence, xkcds quirky and technical humor would have been difficult to syndicate (or simply to publish in many newspapers at once). In webcomics, Munroe has said that "one can draw something that appeals to 1 percent of the audience—1 percent of United States, that is three million people, that is more readers than small cartoons can have." Munroe cited the lack of a need for editorial control due to the low bar of access to the Internet as "a salvation".

Recurring themes 

While there is no specific storyline to the webcomic, there are some recurring themes and characters. Recurring themes of xkcd include "technology, science, mathematics and relationships." xkcd frequently features jokes related to popular culture, such as Guitar Hero, Facebook, Vanilla Ice, Linux, and Wikipedia.

There are many strips opening with the words "My Hobby:", usually depicting the nondescript narrator character describing some type of humorous or quirky behavior. However, not all strips are intended to be humorous. Romance and relationships are frequent themes, and other xkcd strips consist of complex depictions of landscapes. Many xkcd strips refer to Munroe's "obsession" with potential Velociraptor attacks.

References to Wikipedia articles or to Wikipedia as a whole have occurred several times in xkcd. A facsimile of a made-up Wikipedia entry for "malamanteau" (a stunt word created by Munroe to poke fun at Wikipedia's writing style) provoked a controversy within Wikipedia that was picked up by various media. Another strip depicted an example of a topic that Wikipedia could not cover neutrally—a fictional donation to either anti-abortion or abortion-rights activists, determined by the word count in a Wikipedia article on the event where the donation was announced being either odd or even. Wikipedia is also depicted as an extension of one's mind, allowing them to access far more information than normally.

Nearly all xkcd strips have a tooltip, the text of which usually contains a secondary punchline or annotation related to that day's comic.

One of the few recurring characters is a man wearing a flat black hat. He has dedicated his life to causing confusion and harm to others just for his own entertainment. He has no name, though he is commonly referred to as "Black Hat" or "Black Hat Guy" in the community. He gained a girlfriend, commonly named "Danish" by the community, during the course of a small series called "Journal", who is just as cruel as he is.

Another recurring character is a man with a beret, sometimes simply referred to as "Beret Guy". He seems to be naïve, obsessed with bakeries, optimistic, and completely out of touch with reality. He also has magical abilities, which often manifest in the creation of situations or objects that support his overly optimistic worldview, even when in direct violation of societal norms or the laws of physics; an example is his startup making incredible amounts of money despite his not even knowing what they do. In one instance, he hired Lin-Manuel Miranda as an engineer and, in another instance, sprouted literal "endless wings".

Geographical maps, their various different formats and creation methods are a frequently recurring theme in the comic. On occasion these maps have been mentioned by analysts due to their imaginative or original presentation of figures or statistics. In the comic "2016 Election Map", colored stick figures are used to display how people voted according to their region giving a clearer picture of how people voted in the 2016 election, which was praised as being a strong visualization tool for the election outcome.

Inspired activities 

On several occasions, fans have been motivated by Munroe's comics to carry out the subject of a particular drawing or sketch offline. Some notable examples include:

 Richard Stallman was confronted by students dressed as ninjas before speaking at the Yale Political Union – inspired by "Open Source".
 On September 23, 2007, hundreds of people gathered at Reverend Thomas J. Williams Park, in North Cambridge, Massachusetts, whose coordinates were mentioned in "Dream Girl". Munroe appeared, commenting, "Maybe wanting something does make it real", reversing the conclusion he drew in the last frame of the same strip. This park is recognized by NASA's Spot The Station program, which provides information on viewing opportunities for the International Space Station.

When animated xkcd strip "Time" won a Hugo Award for Best Graphic Story in August 2014, it was accepted by Cory Doctorow on behalf of Munroe, dressing as Munroe had drawn him in an earlier strip, "1337: Part 5".
 xkcd readers began sneaking chess boards onto roller coasters after "Chess Photo" was published. – inspired by "Chess Photo".
 The game of "geohashing" has gained more than 1,000 players, who travel to random coordinates calculated by the algorithm described in "Geohashing".
 In October 2007, a group of researchers at University of Southern California's Information Sciences Institute conducted a census of the Internet and presented their data using a Hilbert curve, which they claimed was inspired by an xkcd comic that used a similar technique. Inspired by the same comic, the Carna botnet used a Hilbert curve to present data in their 2012 Internet Census.
 Based on "Packages", programmers have set up programs to automatically find an item for sale on the Internet for $1.00 every day.
 In response to "Password Strength", Dropbox shows two messages reading "lol" and "Whoa there, don't take advice from a webcomic too literally ;)" when attempting to register with the password "correcthorsebatterystaple". ArenaNet recommended that Guild Wars 2 users create secure passwords following the guidelines of the same comic.
 The Python Standard Library module "antigravity", when run, opens the xkcd comic "Python". On the 4th of June 2009, a function was added into the "antigravity" module that implements the geohashing algorithm (which is inspired by the 426th xkcd comic, also titled "Geohashing"), according to the commit history of CPython's git repository.
 Inspired by the xkcd comic "Online Communities 2", Slovak artist Martin Vargic created the "Map of the Internet 1.0."
 In 2008, Munroe posted a parody of the Discovery Channel's I Love the World advertising campaign on xkcd, which was later reenacted by Neil Gaiman, Wil Wheaton, and Cory Doctorow.
 Munroe's 2012 comic "Up-Goer Five" on the Saturn V rocket inspired the "Up-Goer Five Challenge" for scientists.  The original comic described the rocket only using the one thousand most frequent words in contemporary fiction; in the same way, the challenge is for scientists to describe their journal articles and scientific papers with extremely basic language.  More generally, even when not adhering to the original strict list, the comic has been cited as an example of the merits in avoiding too much jargon that can make scientific papers impenetrable and unread.

Awards and recognition 
xkcd has been recognized at various award ceremonies. In the 2008 Web Cartoonists' Choice Awards, the webcomic was nominated for "Outstanding Use of the Medium", "Outstanding Short Form Comic", and "Outstanding Comedic Comic", and it won "Outstanding Single Panel Comic". xkcd was voted "Best Comic Strip" by readers in the 2007 and 2008 Weblog Awards. The webcomic was nominated for a 2009 NewNowNext Award in the category "OMFG Internet Award".

Randall Munroe was nominated for the Hugo Award for Best Fan Artist in both 2011 and 2012, and he won a Hugo Award for Best Graphic Story in 2014, for "Time".

Books 
In September 2009, Munroe released a book, entitled xkcd: volume 0, containing selected xkcd comics. The book was published by breadpig, under a Creative Commons license, CC BY-NC 3.0, with all of the publisher's profits donated to Room to Read to promote literacy and education in the developing world. Six months after release, the book had sold over 25,000 copies. The book tour in New York City and Silicon Valley was a fundraiser for Room to Read that raised $32,000 to build a school in Salavan Province, Laos.

In October 2012, xkcd: volume 0 was included in the Humble Bundle eBook Bundle. It was available for download only to those who donated higher than the average donated for the other eBooks. The book was released DRM-free, in two different-quality PDF files.

On March 12, 2014, Munroe announced the book What If?: Serious Scientific Answers to Absurd Hypothetical Questions. The book was released on September 2, 2014. The book expands on the What If? blog on the xkcd website. On May 13, 2015, Munroe announced a new book entitled Thing Explainer. Eventually released on November 24, 2015, Thing Explainer is based on the xkcd strip "Up Goer Five" and only uses the thousand most commonly used words to explain different scientific devices.

On February 5, 2019, Munroe announced a fourth book, titled How To, which uses math and science to find the worst possible solutions to everyday problems. It was released on September 3, 2019.

On January 31, 2022, Munroe announced the book What If? 2: Additional Serious Scientific Answers to Absurd Hypothetical Questions, covering "new questions I've received in the years since What If? was released". What If? 2 was released on September 13, 2022.

See also

 Saturday Morning Breakfast Cereal (SMBC) – A web comic in a somewhat similar vein

References

Primary sources
In the text, these references are preceded by a double dagger (‡):

Further reading 
 
 
 
  An article on the impact of xkcd topics on Google searches.

External links 

 
 xkcd What-If
 Explain xkcd, a wiki dedicated to explaining the references found in each comic

2000s webcomics
2010s webcomics

2020s webcomics

2005 webcomic debuts
American comedy webcomics
Computer humor
Creative Commons-licensed comics
Hacker culture
Infinite canvas webcomics
Nerd culture
Short form webcomics
Web Cartoonists' Choice Award winners
Webcomics in print